Heritage International Xperiential School (HIXS) is an international co-educational school associated with the International General Certificate of Secondary Education (IGCSE) and the International Baccalaureate Diploma Programme (IBDP). It is a part of Heritage group of schools.

Background 
The school was founded by Manit Jain. It introduced experiential learning and project-based expeditionary pedagogy in India. In 2004 school eliminated text books, uniform and examinations until eighth grade.

In 2019 the school led an initiative on waste management and multi laminated packaging in collaboration with NGO Safai Bank. Students of the school collected and deposited 14000 MLP packs to the NGO.

In 2022 the school partnered with Sweden embassy to engage youth in dialogue of climate change, ahead of Stockholm +50, an international meet on climate change and environmental protection, where selected students from the school participated in panel discussion on well-being of present and future generations.

References 

Co-educational schools in India
International Baccalaureate schools in India
Private schools in Haryana
Education in Gurgaon